The North Platte Micropolitan Statistical Area, as defined by the United States Census Bureau, is an area consisting of three counties in Nebraska, anchored by the city of North Platte.  As of the 2000 census, the area had a population of 35,939 (though a July 1, 2009 estimate placed the population at 36,890).

Counties
Lincoln
Logan
McPherson

Communities
Brady
Gandy
Hershey
Maxwell
North Platte (Principal City)
Ringgold (unincorporated)
Stapleton
Sutherland
Tryon (unincorporated)
Wallace
Wellfleet

Demographics
As of the census of 2000, there were 35,939 people, 14,594 households, and 9,830 families residing within the USA. The racial makeup of the USA was 94.83% White, 0.53% African American, 0.51% Native American, 0.36% Asian, 0.02% Pacific Islander, 2.58% from other races, and 1.17% from two or more races. Hispanic or Latino of any race were 5.27% of the population.

The median income for a household in the USA was $31,814, and the median income for a family was $38,464. Males had a median income of $29,229 versus $17,517 for females. The per capita income for the USA was $15,563.

See also
Nebraska census statistical areas

References

 
Lincoln County, Nebraska
Logan County, Nebraska
McPherson County, Nebraska